The 2022 Women's Euro Winners Cup was the seventh edition of the Women's Euro Winners Cup (WEWC), an annual continental beach soccer tournament for women's top-division European clubs. The championship is the sport's version of the UEFA Women's Champions League in association football.

Organised by Beach Soccer Worldwide (BSWW), the tournament was held in Nazaré, Portugal, in tandem with the larger men's edition, from 6–12 June.

The event began with a round robin group stage. At its conclusion, the best teams progressed to the knockout stage, a series of single elimination games to determine the winners, starting with the quarter-finals and ending with the final. Consolation matches were also played to determine other final rankings.

Madrid CFF of Spain were the defending champions, but did not enter the competition this year. It was won by Bonaire Terrassa of Spain, who won their first title.

Teams 
17 clubs from ten different nations entered the event.

In accordance with sanctions imposed by FIFA and UEFA in response to the 2022 Russian invasion of Ukraine, clubs from Russia were banned from entering.

Key: H: Hosts \ TH: Title holders

Draw 
The draw to split the 17 clubs into groups took place at 12:00 CEST (UTC+2) on 6 May at BSWW's headquarters in Barcelona, Spain.

Group stage
The designation of "home" and "away" teams displayed in the results matrices is for administrative purposes only.

Matches took place from 6 to 9 June.

The group winners and runners-up progress to the knockout stage. The third and fourth placed teams recede to the 9th–16th place placement matches.
Key

Group A

Group B

Group C

Group D

Placement matches
Key

Knockout stage
The draw for the quarter-finals, and allocation of ties to the bracket, took place after the conclusion of all group stage matches on 9 June.

Awards
The following individual awards were presented after the final.

Top goalscorers
Players with at least four goals are listed.

9 goals
 Mélissa Gomes ( Marseille BT)

7 goals

 Sarah Kempson ( FC10 Ladies)
 Sina Cavelti ( Rappiranhas)
 Maria Romero ( Huelva)
 Saira Posada ( Huevla)
 Cristina Gonzalez ( Bonaire Terrassa)
 Justine Gomboso ( Newteam Brussels)
 Ali Hall ( Newteam Brussels)

6 goals

 Klaudia Grodzicka ( FC10 Ladies)
 Ania Davydenko ( FC10 Ladies)
 Emilia Jaatinen ( Kylävainion Päälliköt)
 Fabiana Vecchione ( Pastéis)
 Adriana Manau ( Bonaire Terrassa)
 Anaëlle Wiard ( San Javier)
 Carol Gonzalez ( San Javier)

5 goals

 Anna Król ( FC10 Ladies)
 Niina Mäenpää ( Kylävainion Päälliköt)
 Eva Bachmann ( Rappiranhas)
 Myriam-aÏcha Belkiri ( Marseille BT)
 Molly Clark ( Higicontrol Melilla)
 María Jesús ( Cáceres)
 Paloma Lázaro ( San Javier)

4 goals

 Berni Angstwurm ( Bavaria Bazis)
 Miia Koppanen ( Kylävainion Päälliköt)
 Vanessa Meyer ( Rappiranhas)
 Érica Ferreira ( Pastéis)
 Cristina Dominguez ( Huevla)
 Estela Fernandez ( Terrassa Bonaire)
 Aniek Van Den Broek ( Zeeland)
 Nidia Bos ( Zeeland)
 Louise Arseneault ( Newteam Brussels)
 Lauren Leslie ( Newteam Brussels)
 Maelys Goumeziane ( Amnéville)
 Natalia De Francisco ( Higicontrol Melilla)
 Maria Soto ( Higicontrol Melilla)
 Raquel Ayuso ( Cáceres)

Source: BSWW

Final standings

References

External links 
Women's Euro Winners Cup 2022, at Beach Soccer Worldwide
Women's Euro Winners Cup 2022, at ZeroZero.pt (in Portuguese)

Women's Euro Winners Cup
2022 in beach soccer
Euro
2022
Nazaré, Portugal
Euro Winners Cup